Raoul du Gardier (1 April 1871 – 17 October 1952) was a French painter. He was a student of Gustave Moreau at the École des Beaux-Arts, Paris in the 1890s. His work was part of the art competitions at the 1928 Summer Olympics and the 1932 Summer Olympics.

References

1871 births
1952 deaths
20th-century French painters
20th-century French male artists
French male painters
Olympic competitors in art competitions
People from Wiesbaden
19th-century French male artists